The 1915–16 Bucknell Bison men's basketball team represented Bucknell University during the 1915–16 NCAA men's basketball season. The head coach was George Cockill, coaching the Bison in his second season.The Bison's team captain was F.C. Brenner.

Schedule

|-

References

Bucknell Bison men's basketball seasons
Bucknell
Bucknell
Bucknell